The discography of Ella Eyre, an English singer and songwriter. Her debut studio album, Feline, was released in August 2015. It peaked at number 4 on the UK Albums Chart. The album includes the singles "Deeper", "If I Go", "Comeback", "Together" and "Good Times".

Studio albums

Extended plays

Singles

As lead artist

As featured artist

Other charted songs

Guest appearances

Songwriting credits

Notes

References

Discographies of British artists